In law, an en banc session (French for "in bench"; also known as in banc, in banco or in bank) is a session in which a case is heard before all the judges of a court (before the entire bench) rather than by one judge or a smaller panel of judges.

En banc review is used for unusually complex or important cases or when the court feels there is a particularly significant issue at stake.

United States

Federal appeals courts in the United States sometimes grant rehearing to reconsider the decision of a panel of the court (consisting of only three judges) in which the case concerns a matter of exceptional public importance or the panel's decision appears to conflict with a prior decision of the court. In rarer instances, an appellate court will order hearing en banc as an initial matter instead of the panel hearing it first.

Cases in United States courts of appeals are heard by three-judge panels, randomly chosen from the sitting appeals court judges of that circuit. If a party loses before a circuit panel they may appeal for a rehearing en banc.  A majority of the active circuit judges must agree to hear or rehear a case en banc. The Federal Rules of Appellate Procedure state that en banc proceedings are disfavored but may be ordered to maintain uniformity of decisions within the circuit or if the issue is exceptionally important (Fed. R. App. P. 35(a)). 

Each federal circuit has their own particular rules regarding en banc proceedings. The circuit rules for the Seventh Circuit provide a process where, under certain circumstances, a panel can solicit the consent of the other circuit judges to overrule a prior decision and thus avoid the need for an en banc proceeding. Federal law provides that for courts with more than 15 judges, an en banc hearing may consist of "such number of members of its en banc courts as may be prescribed by rule of the court of appeals." The Ninth Circuit, with 29 judges, uses this procedure, and its en banc court consists of 11 judges. Theoretically, the Ninth Circuit can render en banc decisions with all 29 judges participating; such a hearing would overrule a prior 11-judge en banc hearing on the same case. Though no rule exists barring a party from requesting such a hearing, none has ever been granted. The Fifth Circuit, with 17 judges, adopted a similar procedure in 1986. State of La. ex rel. Guste v. M/V TESTBANK, 752 F.2d 1019 (5th Cir. 1985) (en banc). The Sixth Circuit has 16 judges, but , has not adopted such a policy yet. The FISA Court sat en banc for the first time in 2017 in a case concerning bulk data collection.

United Kingdom 
Neither the term "en banc" nor the related term "full court" are in common use in the UK.

The UK Supreme Court has criteria in place to determine the size of the panel that sits on any one case, and particularly important cases can be heard by a panel comprising all but one of the justices, but this is not referred to as sitting en banc in the UK.

The Supreme Court has twelve justices, and cases are ordinarily decided by panels of five. The largest possible panel is 11 of the 12 justices, to prevent a deadlock. Eleven judges may sit on a panel:
 in cases where the court is being asked to depart, or may decide to depart from a previous decision;
 in cases of high constitutional importance or great public importance;
 in cases where a conflict between decisions in the House of Lords (as a court), Privy Council (as a court) and/or the Supreme Court has to be reconciled; or
 in cases raising an important point in relation to the European Convention on Human Rights.
, only two cases have been heard by the maximum panel of 11 justices, both arising out of political events relating to Brexit: R (Miller) v Secretary of State for Exiting the European Union ("Miller I"), which was heard by all 11 serving justices (there was one judicial vacancy at the time) and decided by an 8–3 majority, and R (Miller) v The Prime Minister and Cherry v Advocate General for Scotland ("Miller II"), which was heard by 11 of the 12 serving justices (Lord Briggs did not sit) and decided unanimously.

Japan 
The Supreme Court of Japan, which has a total of fifteen justices, ordinarily hears cases in panels of five judges, but is required to hear cases en banc (by the "Grand Bench", 大法廷 daihōtei) when ruling on most constitutional issues, when overturning a previous decision of the Supreme Court, when the five-judge panel is unable to reach a decision, and in other limited cases.

Australia 
Appeals to the High Court of Australia (the federal supreme court of Australia) are sometimes heard by the full bench of all seven justices. Cases that are heard by the full bench include cases of constitutional significance, or where the court is being asked to overrule a previous decision, or cases that involve principles of major public importance. 

The state supreme courts and the Federal Court of Australia often hear appeals by a "full court" of judges, but this does not normally include all the judges on the court. For example, in New South Wales, particularly important appeal cases are heard by five judges, chosen from a pool of more than a dozen appeal judges.

Some court buildings in Australia include a courtroom specifically called the "banco court", which is a large courtroom where the judges of the court can sit en banc - with in banco, the Medieval Latin term, being preferred in Australia over the Norman French equivalent en banc. They are used for full bench hearings, as well as ceremonies.

France 
In France, the Court of Cassation (France's highest judicial court) sometimes hears cases that represent very significant legal issues, as well as cases in which lower appeals courts have failed to apply its rulings as ordered, in an en banc formation known as the Assemblée plénière (Plenary Session). This consists of a nineteen-member panel composed of the Chief Justice of the Court of Cassation and three members from each of the Court's six divisions.

See also
 Full court

References

External links 
 
 

Civil procedure
French legal terminology